The 1896 Penn State football team was an American football team that represented Pennsylvania State College—now known as Pennsylvania State University–as an independent during the 1896 college football season. The team was coached by Samuel B. Newton and played its home games on Beaver Field in University Park, Pennsylvania.

Schedule

References

Penn State
Penn State Nittany Lions football seasons
Penn State football